Peter Moodie DSO (24 May 1892 – 1947) was a Scottish amateur footballer who played for Queen's Park as a centre forward.

Personal life 
Prior to the First World War, Moodie worked as an invoice clerk for his father, who was managing director of canvas merchants Andrew Mitchell and Co Ltd in Glasgow. On 5 September 1914, he enlisted as a private in the Highland Light Infantry and was posted to the Western Front in January 1915. He was commissioned as an officer in 1916. In April 1918, he was awarded the DSO for "conspicuous gallantry and devotion to duty" when he was thrice wounded while holding the line and then making a withdrawal during an intelligence-gathering operation near Passchendaele, Belgium. He was evacuated back to Britain and demobbed in March 1919. After the war, Moodie returned to work for Andrew Mitchell and Co Ltd.

Career statistics

References 

Scottish footballers
Queen's Park F.C. players
Footballers from Glasgow
1892 births
1947 deaths
Highland Light Infantry officers
British Army personnel of World War I
Companions of the Distinguished Service Order
Association football forwards
People from Gorbals